The Istog River is a river originating near the city of Istog, Kosovo, around 560 m in altitude. It is a tributary of the White Drin and joins it near Berkovo, also in Kosovo. The water quality of the 23-km-long river remains even throughout and is considered the cleanest in the country.

References

Rivers of Kosovo